The men's team, European system was an artistic gymnastics event held as part of the Gymnastics at the 1912 Summer Olympics programme. It was one of three team gymnastics events. The others were a team competition in the Swedish system and one in the free system.

It was the third appearance of the event, which had made its debut in 1904. The official name was Team Competition II - with exercises according to special conditions. For every nation one team was allowed to participate. One team had to consist of not less than 16 nor more than 40 members. The entry was closed on June 6, 1912. As all other gymnastic competitions the event took place in the Olympiastadion.

The competition was held on Thursday July 11, 1912 in the time from 9:30 a.m. to 12:30 p.m. and from 2:00 p.m. to 4:00 p.m.

Starting order

Results

Judges

Chief Leader: Einar Nerman

Scores are an average of five judges' marks.

Score boards

Luxembourg

Hungary

Germany

Great Britain

Italy

Final standings

References

Sources
 
 

Gymnastics at the 1912 Summer Olympics